No Quiero Que Me Engañes is a studio album released in 1985 by the Mexican group Los Freddy's.

Track listing

External links
 [ Billboard.com]

1985 albums
Los Freddy's albums